Chasing is a 2021 Indian Tamil-language action crime film written and directed by Veerakumar on his directorial debut. The film features Varalaxmi Sarathkumar in the lead role. The film had a theatrical release on 16 April 2021. It was released to negative reviews.

Plot 
Athira (Varalaxmi Sarathkumar) is seen chasing goons and drug peddlers in different locations. The film opens with the kidnapping of a girl who gets rescued by Athira in a few minutes, followed by an investigation.

Cast 
 Varalaxmi Sarathkumar as Athira
 Mathialagan Muniandy
 Super Subbarayan as Padikuthan
 Bala Saravanan as Rocky
 Imman Annachi as Police constable
 Sona Heiden as Sona
 Sankar Guru Raja as Police commissioner
 Jerald as Jerald

Production 
Principal photography of the film began during April 2019 in Malacca, Malaysia. A first look poster for the film was released to mark Tamil New Year 2019. For the film, Varalaxmi filmed seven separate action scenes.

A theatrical trailer of the film was released in November 2020 by director Bharathiraja.

Release
The film had a theatrical release on 16 April 2021. A reviewer from Cinema Express wrote Chasing is "an awful, loud cop film with not a shred of logic" and that "with writing that's all over the place, the film fails in every possible way". A reviewer from Times of India noted "the film, which lacks thrills, adequate character detailing and engaging narration, is a forgettable snooze fest".

References

External links
 

Indian action thriller films
Indian police films
2021 directorial debut films
2021 films
2020s Tamil-language films